Where Atilla Passes is a Canadian drama film, directed by Onur Karaman and released in 2015.

The film stars Émile Schneider as Atilla, the Turkish-born adopted son of Québécois couple Michel (Roy Dupuis) and Julie (Julie Deslauriers). Suffering from social anxiety and haunted by a vague inchoate memory of the family tragedy that led to his adoption, he is slowly drawn out of his shell by his interactions with Ahmet (Cansel Elçin), his new Turkish immigrant coworker, and Asya (Dilan Gwyn), a young woman with whom he begins a new romantic relationship.

The film premiered in November 2015 at the Festival du cinéma international en Abitibi-Témiscamingue, before going into general theatrical release in early 2016.

Accolades
At the 19th Quebec Cinema Awards in 2017, Schneider received a nomination for Best Actor.

References

External links
 

2015 films
2015 drama films
Canadian drama films
Quebec films
Films set in Montreal
Films shot in Montreal
French-language Canadian films
2010s Canadian films
2010s French-language films